Adika is both a given name and a surname. Notable people with the name include:

Given name 
Adika Peter-McNeilly, Canadian professional basketball player

Surname 
David Adika, Israeli photographer and educator
Stefan Adika, bassist and former member of L.A. Guns